Baybaşin is a Turkish surname. Notable people with the surname include:

 Abdullah Baybaşin, a Turkish gangster accused and convicted of being a drug lord but on retrial not found guilty
 Hüseyin Baybaşin, brother of Abdullah, convicted of smuggling drugs and serving a life sentence

Turkish-language surnames